Roy Jones  (29 August 1924 – 2005), born Roy Shufflebottom, was an English footballer who played in the Football League for Stoke City.

Career 

Shufflebottom joined Stoke during World War II and eventually made his Football League debut in the 1947–48 season. In 1948 he changed his name by deed poll to Jones. He played a further six matches for Stoke until 1950 when he left and joined non-league Stafford Rangers.

Career statistics

References 

English footballers
Stoke City F.C. players
Stafford Rangers F.C. players
English Football League players
1924 births
2005 deaths
Association football defenders